Garth Walden is best known as a race driver in his native Australia. He is the son of well-known Sydney race specialist Brian Walden. He has raced in various classes, probably known for his V8 Supercar Season in 2004, driving a privately entered ex Glenn Seton Ford Falcon (AU) where he entered 6 events, qualifying for only 5 of them.

2006 saw him enter the Australian Formula 3 Championship but not start any races. 2007 and 2008 he raced in the Bathurst 12 Hour and 2007 Australian Production Car Championship finishing 8th.

2008 saw him attempt a return to V8 Supercar competition again with his father's Walden Motorsport team after being granted the 32nd licence. This failed to happen and the V8 Supercar plans evaporated. He made a one-off appearance's in the 2009 Fujitsu V8 Supercar Series at the final round in Homebush and 2014 Dunlop V8 Supercar Series at Winton. He moved to sports cars and has had some success in Radicals finishing second in the Supersports & Sports 1300 Interstate Challenge Australia in 2010. In 2016/17 he drove in the Porsche Carrera Cup Australia.

Career stats

Complete Supercar results 
(key) (Races in bold indicate pole position) (Races in italics indicate fastest lap)

Complete Super2 Series results
(key) (Round results only)

Complete Bathurst 12 Hour results

References

 NMD.com.au articles
 PCAA 2007 
 Conrod.com stats
 V8 Supercar news
 Driver Database stats

External links
 Official Site

1981 births
Living people
People from the Mid North Coast
Racing drivers from New South Wales
Supercars Championship drivers
Australian Endurance Championship drivers